The Gaelic Athletic Association & Gaelic Player's Association All Stars Footballer of the Year — known for sponsorship reasons as the PwC GAA/GPA Footballer of the Year — is a Gaelic football award. It is presented annually to the footballer who performed outstandingly in that year's All-Ireland Senior Football Championship.

History
Created in 1995, the award is part of the All Stars Awards, which selects a "fantasy team", comprising the best players from that year's All-Ireland Senior Football Championship. Voting for the award is undertaken by a select group of journalists from television and the print media.

Winners listed by year
Bold denotes a player still active at inter-county level.

Winners listed by province

Multiple Winners
Two players have been named All Stars Footballer of the Year on more than one occasion. They are:

 Trevor Giles of Meath in 1996 and 1999. 
 Brian Fenton of Dublin in 2018 and 2020.

Brothers
Two sets of brothers have been named All Stars Footballer of the Year. They are:

 Brogan: Bernard and Alan of Dublin
 Ó Sé: Tomás and Marc of Kerry

References

1995 establishments in Ireland
Awards established in 1995
Gaelic football awards
GAA GPA All Stars Awards